Marshalliana is a genus of moths in the family Cossidae.

Species
 Marshalliana bivittata Aurivillius, 1901
 Marshalliana jansei Gaede, 1929
 Marshalliana latevittata Hering, 1949

References

External links
Natural History Museum Lepidoptera generic names catalog

Metarbelinae